Sarvenkataja  is a Swedish island belonging to the Haparanda archipelago. The island lies 23 kilometres south of Haparanda. The island has no connection to the main land and except a single house there are no buildings. On Sarvenkataja, Primula nutans and Moehringia lateriflora grow. Sarvenkataja is part of Natura 2000.

References

Islands of Sweden